Rachel Joanne Recchia (born March 8, 1996) is an American television personality who appeared on season 26 of The Bachelor, and co-starred in season 19 of The Bachelorette alongside Gabby Windey.

Early life and education 
Recchia was born in Chicago, Illinois, to parents Tony and Mary Anne Recchia, and moved to Clermont, Florida as a teenager. She has a younger brother, Anthony. She graduated from Ohio University with a degree in aviation, and was also a cheerleader in college.

Career 
Prior to appearing on The Bachelor, Recchia worked as a flight instructor while working on her hours to eventually become an airline pilot.

Reality television

The Bachelor 

In September 2021, Recchia was revealed to be a contestant on season 26 of The Bachelor, starring medical sales representative Clayton Echard. She was the co runner-up with fellow finalist Gabby Windey.

The Bachelorette 

During the live After the Final Rose special of Echard's season, Recchia was announced as The Bachelorette alongside Windey. This marks the first time that there will be two leads for an entire season.

Personal life  
On May 13, 2022, Recchia got engaged to Tino Franco, whom she chose as the winner on her season of The Bachelorette. They broke up while the season was airing after he confessed to kissing another woman.

Filmography

References

External links

Living people
1996 births
American television personalities
American women television personalities
Bachelor Nation contestants
Ohio University alumni
People from Clermont, Florida